Antti Kuismala (born 20 January 1976) is a Finnish footballer who currently plays for MP in Finland.

References

1976 births
FC Jazz players
FF Jaro players
Finnish expatriate footballers
Finnish expatriate sportspeople in Norway
Finnish footballers
IFK Mariehamn players
Living people
Myllykosken Pallo −47 players
People from Ristiina
Tampere United players
Veikkausliiga players
Association football goalkeepers
Sportspeople from South Savo